Hesborn is a village and a civil parish (Ortsteil) of the German town of Hallenberg, located in the Hochsauerlandkreis district in North Rhine-Westphalia. As of 2010 its population was of 1,060.

History
The village was first mentioned as Hersporen in 1126. As the two other Ortsteil of Hallenberg Hesborn was, until 1974, an autonomous municipality belonging to the former District of Brilon and to the Amt Hallenberg. In 1975 it was incorporated into the city of Hallenberg.

Geography
Hesborn is located 4,5 km in north of Hallenberg, close to Liesen and to the Bollerberg, a mountain belonging to the mountain range of Rothaargebirge. It is  7 km far from Bromskirchen, a municipality in the bordering state of Hesse. It is served by the road L617 and crossed by the river Nuhne.

See also
Hallenberg
Braunshausen
Liesen

References

External links
 Hesborn official website

Villages in North Rhine-Westphalia
Hallenberg
1120s establishments in the Holy Roman Empire
1126 establishments in Europe